The 1909 Edinburgh South by-election was held on 4 March 1909.  The by-election was held due to the incumbent Liberal MP, Arthur Dewar, being appointed Solicitor General for Scotland.  It was retained by Dewar.

References

Edinburgh South by-election
Edinburgh South by-election
1900s elections in Scotland
1900s in Edinburgh
Edinburgh South by-election
By-elections to the Parliament of the United Kingdom in Edinburgh constituencies
Ministerial by-elections to the Parliament of the United Kingdom